A Wife's Romance is a 1923 American silent drama film directed by Thomas N. Heffron and starring Clara Kimball Young, Lewis Dayton and Alan Roscoe.

Synopsis
A female artist, neglected by her diplomat husband, becomes involved with a Spaniard whose portrait she is painting.

Cast
 Clara Kimball Young as Joyce Addison 
 Lewis Dayton as John Addison 
 Alan Roscoe as Ramón 
 Lillian Adrian as Joseffa 
 Wedgwood Nowell as Marquis de Castellar
 Robert Cauterio as Pablo 
 Arthur Stuart Hull as Evan Denbigh
 Louise Bates Mortimer as Isabel de Castellar

References

Bibliography
 Munden, Kenneth White. The American Film Institute Catalog of Motion Pictures Produced in the United States, Part 1. University of California Press, 1997.

External links

1923 films
1923 drama films
Silent American drama films
Films directed by Thomas N. Heffron
American silent feature films
1920s English-language films
American black-and-white films
Metro Pictures films
1920s American films